Burden is a 2018 American drama film, inspired by true events. The film was produced by Robbie Brenner and Bill Kenright, and was written and directed by Andrew Heckler. The film stars Garrett Hedlund, Forest Whitaker, Andrea Riseborough, Tom Wilkinson, Tess Harper, and Usher. The film premiered at the 2018 Sundance Film Festival and won the U.S. Dramatic Audience Award.

Plot
The film follows Mike Burden (Garrett Hedlund), an orphan raised within the Ku Klux Klan who attempts to break away when the woman (Andrea Riseborough) he falls in love with urges him to leave for a better life together. The Klan seeks Mike out for vengeance. A black Baptist church congregation, led by Reverend Kennedy (Forest Whitaker), agrees to protect Mike, his girlfriend and her son.

Cast
 Garrett Hedlund as Mike Burden
 Forest Whitaker as Reverend David Kennedy
 Andrea Riseborough as Judy
 Tom Wilkinson as Tom Griffin
 Usher as Clarence Brooks
 Crystal R. Fox as Janice Kennedy
 Dexter Darden as Kelvin Kennedy
 Austin Hébert as Clint
 Taylor Gregory as Franklin
 Tess Harper as Hazel Griffin
 Devin Bright as Duane Brooks
 Joshua Burge as Ronny

Production
Production of the film began October 20, 2016 and was set to wrap up on November 15, 2016.

Critical response
The website's critical consensus reads, "Burden grapples clumsily with its undeniably worthy themes, but its honorable intentions — and strong performances — make it easy to forgive those flaws." Metacritic gives the film a weighted average of 63/100 based on 6 critic reviews, indicating "generally favorable reviews."

See also
List of black films of the 2010s

References

External links 
 

2018 films
2018 drama films
Films about evangelicalism
Films about religious leaders
Films about racism
Films about poverty
Films set in 1996
Films set in South Carolina
Films about the Ku Klux Klan
American drama films
Drama films based on actual events
Sundance Film Festival award winners
2010s English-language films
2010s American films